= Russian cube =

Russian cube may refer to:

- Rubik's Cube, a 3-D mechanical puzzle
- Tetris, a puzzle video game
